The 2021 Münsterland Giro (known as the Sparkasse Münsterland Giro for sponsorship reasons) was the 15th edition of the Münsterland Giro road cycling one day race, held mostly in the titular region of northwest Germany on 3 October 2021. This edition was the race's first in the UCI ProSeries; the 2020 edition was expected to feature in the inaugural UCI ProSeries but was cancelled due to the COVID-19 pandemic.

The  race started in Enschede, just across the border in the Netherlands. After crossing into Germany, riders take on several hills, consisting of the two ascents each of the Coesfelder Berg and the Daruper Berg and one ascent of the Schöppinger Berg. The first of two sprint points was in Laer after , with a second sprint point  later near Altenberge.

Teams 
Five of the 19 UCI WorldTeams, four UCI ProTeams, seven UCI Continental teams, and the German national team made up the 18 teams that participated in the race. In total, 121 riders started the race.

UCI WorldTeams

 
 
 
 
 

UCI ProTeams

 
 
 
 

UCI Continental Teams

 
 
 
 
 
 
 

National Teams

 Germany

Result

References

Sources

External links 
  

Münsterland Giro
Münsterland Giro
Münsterland Giro
Münsterland Giro